Road signs in Sri Lanka are standardized to closely follow those used in Europe with certain distinctions, and a number of changes have introduced road signs that suit as per local road and system. Sri Lankan government announced by a gazette that aimed to get a facelift and introduction of over 100 new road traffic signs. The new change will be replaced in colour and sizes and introduction of Variable-message sign & electronic digital sign boards in express highways. The Japanese government has granted LKR 1.24 billion to implement message signs in expressways.

Language applicable traffic sign boards are in Sinhalese, Tamil and English. The motor traffic act (chapter 203) describes road traffic signs.

Znaki drogowe

Regulatory signs

Prohibitory signs

Restrictive signs

Mandatory signs

Priority signs

Additional panels 
Additional panels to be used with regulatory signs

Directional informative signs

National Highways

Provincial Roads

Expressways

Other signs useful for drivers

Route number signs

Additional panels 
Additional Panels to be used with Directional Informative Signs

Miscellaneous signs

Road markings

Traffic light signals

Light signals for pedestrians

Prohibited distance 
Prohibited distance for parking of vehicles

Hazard-warning plates 
Hazard-warning plates fixed to transport vehicles

See also 
Transport in Sri Lanka

References 

Road transport in Sri Lanka
Sri Lanka